Mas'ud al-Madi (died 1834) was a local Arab political figure in Palestine in the first half of the 19th century, during Ottoman and Egyptian rule. The al-Madi family had Bedouin roots and originally hailed from the Beersheba area. They later made the village of Ijzim in northern Palestine, near Haifa, their seat of power. Mas'ud was a local sheikh and allied himself with Sulayman Pasha, the governor of Acre between 1804-19. During that period, Sulayman appointed Mas'ud mutasallim of Haifa and the Atlit coast, an area that stretched between the village of Umm Khalid near Jaffa up until the area just south of Acre. By 1830, he became the mutasallim (tax collector) of Jaffa. He was also the mutasallim of Gaza, Ramla and Lydda. He resided in a large house in Acre. Mas'ud was executed by Ibrahim Pasha in 1834, during Egyptian rule, for his role in the countrywide Peasants' Revolt in Palestine.

References

Bibliography

  

1834 deaths
19th-century people from the Ottoman Empire
19th-century executions by Egypt
Arabs in Ottoman Palestine
Political people from the Ottoman Empire
People of the peasants' revolt in Palestine
Ottoman governors of Gaza